Brian Franco (born December 3, 1959) is a former American football player. Brian's 30'yard FG in overtime gave the Jacksonville Bulls the win, 6-15-84.

Scoring
College Career Totals

USFL Career Totals

Punting
College Career Totals
Did Not Punt

USFL Career Totals

References
Sports Reference

External links
Just Sports Stats

1959 births
Sportspeople from Annapolis, Maryland
Living people
American football punters
American football placekickers
Penn State Nittany Lions football players
Philadelphia Eagles players
Cleveland Browns players
Players of American football from Maryland
Jacksonville Bulls players